"Leflaur Leflah Eshkoshka" is a song by American hip hop group The Fab 5. It was released in 1995 via Duck Down/Priority Records as the lead single from Heltah Skeltah's debut studio album Nocturnal. Recording sessions took place at D&D Studios in New York City. Production was handled by Baby Paul with executive producers Buckshot and Drew "Dru-Ha" Friedman. The song contains a sample from The Catalyst's "Uzuri". Music video was directed by Marcus Turner.

The single peaked at number 75 on the US Billboard Hot 100.

Track listing

Personnel 

"Leflaur Leflah Eshkoshka"
Jack McNair – main artist, vocals
Jahmal Bush – main artist, vocals
Dashawn Jamal Yates – main artist, vocals
Sean Price – main artist, vocals
Barret Powell – main artist, vocals
Paul Hendricks – producer
John Wydrycs – engineering
Dexter Thibou – assistant engineering

"Letha Brainz Blo"
Jahmal Bush – main artist, vocals
Sean Price – main artist, vocals
Paul Hendricks – producer
Akshun – engineering

Charts

References

External links

1996 songs
1996 singles
Hardcore hip hop songs
East Coast hip hop songs
Priority Records singles
Songs written by Sean Price